Woodvale Road is a cricket ground in Eglinton, Northern Ireland. The home team of the ground is Eglinton Cricket Club who were founded in 1936. It has a capacity of 2,000.

The ground has staged two first-class matches and three List A matches, a further two were abandoned without a ball bowled. It also staged a single match between Canada and the Netherlands at the 2005 ICC Trophy. The ground also hosted Ireland's opening match of the Intercontinental Cup against Kenya in 2009.

North West Cricket Union wants to make it a fully international ground as it is one of Ireland's most famous cricket venues. It has hosted a Twenty20 match, Ireland against Bangladesh A. It has also hosted North West cup finals and has seen the Australian national team take to the field.

External links
 Official Eglinton Cricket Club Website
 Irish Cricket Grounds
 Woodvale Road, Eglinton at CricketArchive

Cricket grounds in Northern Ireland
Sports venues in County Londonderry
County Londonderry